Markus Strothmann is a jazz drummer but also likes to play various other styles. He is currently involved in 8 musical projects of various natures, resulting in gigs at high-profile jazz occasions such as “WDR Jazznacht”  as well as “Wacken” in one and the same year. He teaches at the Artez Conservatory of Music in Enschede the Netherlands, as well as two German music schools.

Even during his studies at the Artez Conservatory of Music in Enschede, which he completed with the degree “Master of Music”, Markus Strothmann was able to establish himself as a recognized personality within the European jazz scene.

Strothmann was able to initiate his career as a jazz musician 2009 with his own concert series “Markus Strothmann meets...”, in which he met European jazz personalities such as Nippy Noya, Norbert Gottschalk, Bart van Lier, and many more.

His project, Transitions Organ Duo, a Hammond/Drum duo with Dutch organist John Hondorp, does not only continue work with renowned guest soloists. It displays Markus’s vision of a contemporary jazz music that combines communicational and dynamic aspects of jazz music with the rawness of rock sounds, always in respect of the heritage of jazz music. He likes to refer to this music as “Razz”. On Transitions album “No Idea”, which is to be released end of 2013, Jeanfrançois Prins (guitar) and Frederik Köster (trumpet, winner of the German Jazz Echo prize) join Transitions on Markus compositions “Emerald” and “No Idea”, as well as Prins’s composition Futebol. Larry Goldings listened to this album and commented: ”I’m really impressed with the thoughtfulness of the music.”

Transitions Organ Duo has already impressed audiences on high profiled jazz music events across Europe such as the “WDR Jazznacht” (Jazz event of west German radio) or being headliner of the “International Jazzfestival Enschede”.

During his master's degree studies, Markus was able to broaden his network strongly through writing a research on the network of jazz music in Europe. He visited and lived in London, Dublin and Brussels and interviewed important jazz personalities, such as the heads of the jazz departments at the conservatoires (e.g. the royal academy of music and the guildhall London) and club managers. These interviews, as well as various concerts and lessons he took during this research, gave him an understanding of the various musical outcomes and structures on jazz across Europe. He was always able to keep connections made during this time active, which, for example, resulted in Markus being interviewed by Linley Hamilton of BBC radio. They talked about the Transitions Organ Duo as well as Markus’s research activities. Some tracks of Transitions were played.

His musical, research and educative work left such an impression on the Artez Conservatory of Music in Enschede that he was able to start teaching there directly after finishing his studies. Subjects Markus teaches are jazz drumset and jazz combo for the department “Minor Music”. He also teaches at two music schools in Germany.

References 

1985 births
Living people
German jazz musicians
Jazz drummers
21st-century drummers